Moses Usor (born 5 February 2002) is a Nigerian professional footballer who plays as a winger for LASK on loan from Slavia Prague.

Club career
A youth product of 36 Lions FC, Usor moved to the Slavia Prague B in 2022 and scored 6 goals in 9 games. He was promoted to the senior side, and made his professional and Czech First League debut with Slavia Prague as a late substitute in a 2–1 loss to Sparta Prague on 15 May 2022. On 23 June 2022, he signed a professional contract with the club for 3 years. Usor joined Austrian Football Bundesliga club LASK on a season-long loan deal on 18 January 2023.

Playing style
A left-footed winger, Usor prefers playing on the right and cutting in to shoot. He has a low centre of gravity, is dynamic and fast with good technique.

References

External links
 
 Slavia profile
 Slávistické Noviny profile

2002 births
Living people
Nigerian footballers
Association football wingers
SK Slavia Prague players
Bohemian Football League players
Czech First League players
Nigerian expatriate footballers
Nigerian expatriate sportspeople in the Czech Republic
Expatriate footballers in the Czech Republic
LASK players
Expatriate sportspeople in Austria
Nigerian expatriate sportspeople in Austria